R v Nedrick (1986) is an English criminal law case dealing with mens rea in murder. The case is a cornerstone as it sets down the "virtual certainty test". It applies wherever a form of indirect (oblique) intention is apparent and the charge is one of murder, or other very specific intent. The appellate court ruled, as a binding precedent, that in the law of murder there will be no case to answer where intention to offend is inferred, unless the actions of the defendant are so dangerous that death or serious injury is a virtual certainty.

Facts
The defendant, Hansford Delroy Nedrick, had a grudge against a woman named Viola Foreshaw and threatened to "burn her out". On January 25, 1985, he poured paraffin oil through the letterbox of Foreshaw's home. The fire got out of control and one of Foreshaw's children, a boy named Lloyd, was killed.

Appellate decision reasoning

The court set down model guidance for juries in cases where intention was unclear. Lord Lane CJ said:

“Where the charge is murder and in the rare cases where the simple direction is not enough, the Jury should be directed that they are not entitled to infer the necessary intention unless they feel sure that death or serious bodily harm was a virtual certainty (barring some unforeseen intervention) as a result of the defendant's actions and that the defendant appreciated that such was the case …The decision is one for the Jury to be reached upon a consideration of all the evidence.”

In summary, intent may be inferred if the following conditions are jointly satisfied:

 The result was a virtual certain consequence of an actor's conduct, and
 The actor knows that it is a virtually certain consequence

Notes and references
Footnotes

Citations

N
1986 in England
1986 in case law
1986 in British law
Court of Appeal (England and Wales) cases